Okręglica may refer to the following places:
Okręglica, Greater Poland Voivodeship (west-central Poland)
Okręglica, Łódź Voivodeship (central Poland)
Okręglica, Świętokrzyskie Voivodeship (south-central Poland)